Social network advertising, also social media targeting, is a group of terms that are used to describe forms of online advertising/digital marketing that focus on social networking services. One of the major benefits of this type of advertising is that advertisers can take advantage of the users' demographic information and target their ads appropriately.

Social media targeting combines current targeting options (such as geotargeting, behavioral targeting, socio-psychographic targeting, etc.), to make detailed target group identification possible. Important factors also include what the user likes, comments, views, and follows on social media platforms. With social media targeting, advertisements are distributed to users based on information gathered from target group profiles.

Social network advertising is not necessarily the same as social media targeting. Social media targeting is a method of optimizing social media advertising by using profile data to deliver advertisements directly to individual users. Social network advertising refers to the process of matching social network users to target groups that have been specified by the advertiser. Social media advertising involves creating content on social media platforms, engaging with followers, and running social media advertisements.

Application 
People who use social networking sites give various personal information about themselves, including their age, gender, interests, and location, which are stored on the servers of social media companies. This stored information allows advertisers to create specific target groups and individualize their advertisements. The advantage for advertisers is that their ads can reach a specific set of audiences who are interested in the product or service. The advantage for users is that they can see ads that may be more relevant to their interests.

Facebook 
Facebook has developed a targeting technology that allows advertisements to reach a specific audience. This is within the Facebook product called Facebook Ads, which is available to users and businesses alike. While posting an ad through the Facebook Ad Manager, an advertiser is provided a set of characteristics that will define his target market. Facebook calls this audience targeting. These traits include geographical location, gender, age, work, relationship status, and interests such as music, among others. Facebook claims that advertisers can even customize their target audience based on their behavior such as purchasing patterns, device usage, and other activities. This is why Facebook users see advertisements on their profile pages that are relevant to their preferences and interests. This allows the ads to be less intrusive and more successful in delivering the appropriate content to the right audience. The advertisement algorithm is also capable of monitoring performance so that advertisers or Facebook marketers are able to modify their audience as well as the nature, budget, and duration of the ads based on their performance. Many new advertisers use Facebook as a platform because they have easy-to-use dashboards that are free to access, while at the same time having a large audience to view their advertisements.

Instagram 
Currently, there are about 1 billion users on Instagram and about 500 million users scroll through the app every day seeing multiple posts, reels, videos, and stories. On Instagram, companies can employ influencers for advertising, post from a corporate account, or buy ads from Meta, Instagram's parent company. Social media programs, such as Instagram, uses digital engagement to allow companies to advertise different products. Instagram creates photo ads, video ads, carousel ads, and story ads ranging from $5-$6 per engagement advertisement. The programs evaluate how a consumer engages with the content based on the number of likes, amount of follows, and certain interests based on the preference of the user. The program (Instagram) takes the information gathered about the consumer and creates an environment for the advertisement. Fashion, beauty, and lifestyles are common brands to advertise on Instagram; because about 80% of Instagram users follow at least one brand, usually a fashion brand. Instagram is used on average around 72 minutes a day with users seeing many different advertisements while they scroll through the app.

Snapchat 
Snapchat is a multimedia messaging app developed by Snap Inc., originally Snapchat Inc. One of the principal features of Snapchat is that pictures and messages are usually only available for a short time before they become inaccessible to their recipients. Facebook is the most popular social advertising platform by far, but an increasing number of young people use Snapchat. Pew Research Center data show that 78% percent of young Americans (18–24 years old) use Snapchat (the number goes down to 54% in the 25 to 29 years old group). Snapchat engages in targeting ads by Snap Audience mix, pixel custom audience, ad engagement audience, and third party custom audience.

Twitter 
Twitter is a social networking service where individuals post "tweets" about anything. Twitter first known as Twitter was founded on July 15, 2006. Advertising on Twitter is based solely on interacts an individual makes on the app.  Advertisements that are shown on an individual's Twitter feed are based on the information provided from that individual's profile. Advertisements that are shown on Twitter are classified under three names: Promoted Tweets, Promoted Accounts, and Promoted Trends. Certain advertisements that are placed on an individual's feed can be based on what is popular around the world, or even local to that individual's location; if location services are on. Twitter's product manager Deepak Rao stated that Twitter runs tests on their timeline every month to help Twitter’s key metrics increase. The platform also does not have a full algorithmic timeline unlike Instagram’s feed, and Facebook news.

LinkedIn 
The LinkedIn social media platform was created as an online platform to help employers connect with potential employees. The common type of advertisements on LinkedIn is primarily sponsored posts or direct sponsor content. These types of advertisements are used to share content, and company updates and to direct users to a landing page. Linkedln uses Locations, Audience attributes such as company, job experience, education, demographics, interests, and traits. As well as, Custom audiences you’ve created using Matched Audiences.  All of these indicated ads are portrayed on a LinkedIn account if you are targeted for what they are promoting.  

WhatsApp

Launched in 2009, WhatsApp is a free, multi-platform messaging app that lets users make video and voice calls, send text messages, share their status, and more with just a Wi-Fi connection.  WhatsApp has gained popularity as it allows international calling through wifi only, leaving a very low price for communicating. WhatsApp is the most popular messaging app worldwide, and is the most used app in over 150 countries.  Since meta owns WhatsApp there are going to be targeted ads. In saying so, Facebook announced that it will be using WhatsApp for showing ads on the platform. The ads will be displayed in WhatsApp statuses, just like Instagram and Facebook stories to promote paid content. 
 

Youtube

YouTube is a free video-sharing website that makes it easy to watch online videos. Originally created in 2005, YouTube is now one of the most popular sites on the Web, with visitors watching around 6 billion hours of video every month.  The demographics of YouTube are: 

 82% of U.S. adults who identify as male report using YouTube. ( Pew Research)
 80% of U.S. adults who identify as male say they use YouTube. ( Pew Research)
 45.8% of YouTube's total advertising audience identifies as female. ( Hootsuite)
 54.2% of YouTube's total advertising audience is male. 

Youtube participates in targeting ads by analyzing google searches and reviewing content searched.  Any sort of "Topics", "Placements", "Display/Video keywords", and "Exclusions" for all types of content targeting.  All of these strategies are considered to be used when an ad pops up on YouTube for an individual.

Operation 
Within social communities, users provide demographic information, interests, and images. This information is accessed by social media targeting software and enables advertisers to create display ads with characteristics that match those of social network users. The important component of social media targeting is the provision of the users' socio-demographic and interest information. By using this information, social media targeting makes it possible for users to see advertisements that might actually interest them. The availability of user data allows for detailed analysis and reporting, which is a big part of social media targeting and what makes it more effective than statistical projections alone.

Demographics 
About three-quarters of Internet users are members of at least one social network. 49% of U.S. adult women visit social media sites a few times a day, whereas only 34% of men visit them. 
The fastest-growing age group on Twitter is 55- to 64-year-old, up 79% since 2012. And the 45-54 age group is the fastest-growing on Facebook and Google+.  Social media use is still more common among 89% of Internet users aged 18–29, versus 43% of those who are 65 and older.

Types of advertising 
Popular social media sites, Facebook, Twitter, and YouTube, offer different ways to advertise brands. Facebook gives advertisers options such as promoted posts, sponsored stories, page post ads, Facebook object (like) ads, and external website (standard) ads. To advertise on Twitter there are promoter tweets, trends, and promoted accounts that show up on users' newsfeeds. For advertising on YouTube, there are branded channels, promoted videos, and in video advertising.

In July 2015, during its Q2 earnings call, Facebook revealed that it has achieved $2.9B in mobile revenue, amounting to over 76% of its overall quarterly revenue. A large portion of this revenue was from app install ads, of which developers buy on a Cost per Install basis.

Another type of advertising is using a tool called "buy buttons". Some networks are already getting involved with "buy buttons", or being direct marketers for various products a business wishes to promote on their social media platform. Social networks like Facebook and Twitter are already involved with such partnerships, and this is still just the beginning. The "buy button" is the gateway to impulsive online shopping. These advertisements pop up in the news feed of social media interfaces and also give you the option to click a button and purchase the item right then and there. These account for just under 2% of online sales. The "buy button", which can be traced back to the system being patented by Amazon in 1997, plays not only a circumstantial part in internet sales but internet life.

Even though the realm of social media advertising can be used for sales, it can be for more than just that. For example, social media played a significant role in the 2008 presidential race. Videos that involved both Obama and McCain were able to garner 1.45 billion views. Some of those views and videos could have wavered one's voting decision. Social media advertising also plays a huge role in a brand's or company's reputation and reception. The way a company presents itself can determine its popularity and audience. This tactic is even proven in some studies to be played out on a global scale.

Strategy 
Social media advertising involves creating content on social media platforms, engaging with followers, and running advertisements.  Advertising helps companies spread awareness of their brand. Participating in different advertising campaigns can cause more traffic to the brand's name.

StrategyOne must know the goals they want to achieve and decide which social media platform they will use. In other words, it’s important for brands to set specific advertising objectives when creating online social media ads. Customer engagement, increased revenue & brand awareness, enhanced customer experiences, and thought leadership positioning is typical marketing objectives for social media marketing.
 Planning and publishing Social media is an important step. It can be as simple as planning and publishing a tweet on Twitter. Before companies launch social media advertising campaigns, they must consider and plan out a few elements. This includes: considering their target audience, and allowing a brand to advertise more effectively. As well as, helping to determine what social media is best to reach that target audience. Companies must also plan what type of content it will produce on social media for advertising. Some examples of this content include short-form videos, user-created content, photo campaigns, etc.
Listening and engagement It is important to look at comments, tags, hashtags that the target audience is engaging in. How people connect with your social media accounts and content is measured by social media engagement. The phrase can refer to a wide range of behaviours on all social media sites. Engagement can take the form of actions such as Likes, Favourites, Comments, Direct Messages, Replies, Shares, Retweets, Saves, Clicks, or Mentions. Engagement is very context-specific and consists of varied experiences on each social media platform, allowing for a distinctive user experience on each. Additionally, the experiences associated with advertising evaluations vary depending on the platform.
Analytics Consist of having the knowledge of how social media marketing is performing. For example, this will be how many people were reached on your specified social media platform, or how many mentions the brand got during the month. Business accounts allow brands to track and analyze the analytics. Social media advertising acts as a monitoring tool that provides quantifiable measures, such as the number of likes, shares, comments, opens, views, followers, or clicks, as indicators of the level of engagement. These metrics are used to evaluate the performance of such digital engagement campaigns.
Advertising See online ads.

Pros and cons 
Proponents of social media advertising suggest the following advantages:
 Advertisers can reach users who are interested in their products
 Allows for detailed analysis and reporting (including business intelligence). Companies have access to analytics options on each social network to learn how well their brand profile is doing. Some examples include Facebook Insights, Instagram Insights, Twitter Analytics, YouTube Analytics, LinkedIn Analytics, etc.
 The information gathered is real, not from statistical projections
Improve brand loyalty- Advertising in social media helps companies create a platform where their customers can share their feelings about the product or services offered.
Increase brand awareness, as businesses understand the value of having more engagement between customers and brand, and using social media allows them the chance to more effectively satisfy client demand.
Low cost advertising, the majority of social media advertising strategies work on a pay-per-click (PPC) or pay-per-view (PPV) basis, which means businesses only pay when someone clicks on their advertisement or watches their video advertisement. Brands can reduce their advertising expenses by only spending money when a customer takes an action.
Better search engine ranking- Advertising on social media will bring more online traffic to the company. Individuals use Google as a way to find products, so advertising on social media platforms like Instagram, Twitter and Facebook will help companies with their search engine ranking.
A severe disadvantage for users / consumers  in terms of internet privacy is the widespread use of Web tracking techniques, which can serve to measure social media reach, but which allows the construction of complete personality profiles from ad viewing and clicking.

See also
Social marketing intelligence
Social media marketing

Notes

References 
Pick, Tom. "83 Exceptional Social Media and Marketing Statistics for 2014." Yahoo Small Business Advisor. Yahoo, 20 Apr. 2014.
Statista. "Number of monthly active Facebook users worldwide as of 1st quarter 2015 (in millions)" [online] Available at: 

Social network analysis
Advertising
Digital marketing
Mass media monitoring